Agnes Kirabo is a Ugandan politician and legislator. She is the youth member of parliament representing Uganda's central region in the parliament of Uganda.

She was voted into parliament on the ticket of National Resistance Movement (NRM) party, a party under the chairmanship of Yoweri Museveni president of the republic of Uganda.

Background and Education 
Kirabo an alumna of Makerere University has a master's degree in Business Administration from the same University.

In the NRM party primary elections for youth MPs, she won 11 other contenders with 44%of the vote including Justine Namere daughter of Vicent Ssempijja the minister of defence.

During the 2021 general elections, she won 6 males to emerge youth Mp for the central region youth. She garnered 780 votes beating her closest rival Ivan Bwowe the former makerere University Guild president.

Career 
Kirabo was formerly an employee at the National Resistance Movement secretariat where she served as secretary for female affairs and as an auditor.

She currently serves as the central region Youth member of parliament.

In parliament, Kirabo serves on the committee on trade, tourism and industry.

References 

Year of birth missing (living people)
Living people
Members of the Parliament of Uganda
National Resistance Movement politicians
Women members of the Parliament of Uganda
Makerere University alumni